İzmir Atatürk High School (est. 1888) is a prominent high school in İzmir, Turkey.

History

İzmir Atatürk High School (İAL) was established in 1888 as a 5-year preparatory school. The school was subsequently converted to a 7-year preparatory school in 1890 and became a high school in 1910. Serving more than a hundred years as a day and boarding school for boys, the school started admitting girls in the year 1998.

Presently, the school employs 98 full-time teachers serving the needs of more than 1500 students.

Notable alumni

Prime Ministers
 Şükrü Saracoğlu (6th Prime Minister of Turkey)
 Şemsettin Günaltay (9th Prime Minister of Turkey)

Ministers
 Vasıf Çınar, educator, politician, journalist and diplomat.
 Mustafa Necati, statesman
 Reşit Galip
 Metin Bostancıoğlu
 İlhami Sancar
 Hilmi Uran
 Şerif Tüten
 Sırrı Day
 Sümer Oral

Writers
 Halit Ziya Uşaklıgil
 Ahmet Haşim
 Mehmet Emin Yurdakul
 Yakup Kadri Karaosmanoğlu

Poets
 Necati Cumali
 Attila İlhan

Musicians
 Ahmed Adnan Saygun
 Levent Firat

Chief of the General Staff
 Kazım Orbay
 Memduh Tagmac

Civil servants
 Behçet Uz, physician and Mayor of İzmir
 Hayri Kozakçıoğlu (Province governor)
 Ahmet Priştina Mayor of İzmir

Journalist
 Fatih Portakal

Sportsperson
 Hüseyin Beşok, part of 2001 European Silver Medalist Basketball Team
 Mahmut Özgener, footballer, president of Turkish Football Federation

Businesspeople
 Selim Gökdemir, businessman

Sculptor
 Sadi Calik

Academician / Science / Engineering
Sefaattin Tongay (Professor of Materials Science and Engineering, Arizona, USA)

Dr.Emre Sezgin digital health scientist and innovator, Columbus Ohio, USA

References

High schools in İzmir
Educational institutions established in 1888
1888 establishments in the Ottoman Empire
Things named after Mustafa Kemal Atatürk